Osteen is a surname. Notable people with the surname include:

 Champ Osteen (1877–1962), former baseball shortstop
 Claude Osteen (born 1939), left-handed former baseball pitcher (Cincinnati Reds, Washington Senators, LA Dodgers, Houston Astros, St. Louis Cardinals, Chicago White Sox)
 Darrell Osteen (born 1943), right-handed former baseball pitcher (Cincinnati Reds, Oakland Athletics) 
 John Osteen (1921-1999), first pastor of Lakewood Church in Houston, Texas
 Joel Osteen (born 1963), senior pastor of Lakewood Church in Houston, Texas
 Victoria Osteen (born 1961), wife of Joel Osteen
 William Lindsay Osteen Sr. (1930–2009), judge in North Carolina, USA 
 William Lindsay Osteen Jr. (born 1960), judge in North Carolina, USA